The Jardín de Cactus is a cactus garden on the island of Lanzarote in the Canary Islands.  It is situated in the village of Guatiza, in a former quarry where volcanic sand  lapilli (volcanic pyroclast, locally called "picón" or "rofe") was extracted to spread on cultivated areas to retain moisture. Prickly pears are grown in the area for the production of cochineal, an insect from which the natural dye carmine is derived.

History 
The cactus garden was created in 1991, the last project of César Manrique.  The botanist Estanislao González Ferrer was responsible for the selection and planting of the specimens.  The garden now has 4,500 examples of 450 species of cactus and succulents from North and South America, Madagascar, and other desert and arid areas.

The garden is in the shape of a large amphitheatre, with the plants arranged in terraces.  A restored windmill, once used in the production of gofio, stands at the highest point.

See also 
Desert City
Mossèn Costa i Llobera Gardens

References

External links 

 Official website (in Spanish)

Botanical gardens in the Canary Islands
Tourist attractions in Lanzarote
Cactus gardens